On Body and Soul is a 2017 Hungarian drama film written and directed by Ildikó Enyedi. The story revolves around a CFO of a slaughterhouse and the newly appointed meat quality inspector who discover they can communicate with each other through their dreams, leading to an unlikely romance. It won the Golden Bear in the main competition section of the 67th Berlin International Film Festival. At Berlin it also won the FIPRESCI Prize and the Prize of the Ecumenical Jury. It was selected as the Hungarian entry for the Best Foreign Language Film  and was nominated for the Oscar at the 90th Academy Awards. Alexandra Borbély won the European Actress award at the European Film Awards for her performance in the film.

Plot
Endre, a CFO at an abattoir, and Mária, the newly hired quality inspector, experience a recurring dream of being a pair of deer in the forest, though they are not aware that it is a shared dream.

Mária is immediately unpopular at work for her autistic behaviour and uncompromising grading of the abattoir's meat quality. Though Endre tries to befriend her, she quickly becomes uncomfortable with the interaction and rudely comments on his lame left arm. However, she repeats the conversation to herself that night, analyzing where she made her mistakes. Meanwhile, the abattoir hires a new butcher, Sanyi, who Endre takes a quick dislike to due to his cocky demeanor and unsympathetic view towards the slaughtered animals.

The abattoir is put under investigation when mating powder is stolen from the inventory; Endre and his friend Jenő both suspect that Sanyi is the culprit. A psychologist is hired to perform personality tests on the workers to discover the culprit. The workers are asked questions on the history of their sexuality and physical development, as well as what they dreamed the night before. When Endre and Mária both report the same dream, the psychologist assumes they are playing a prank. Though Endre and Mária are both skeptical, they realize that they are indeed experiencing the same dream and grow closer. Though Mária's behavior temporarily drives Endre away, they eventually form a tight bond. Endre also learns that Jenő stole the mating powder, but chooses not to inform the police as there are no victims, and he apologizes to Sanyi for suspecting him.

Endre and Mária decide to fall asleep in the same room one night, but both are unable to sleep. Although she loves him, Mária shuts down when Endre touches her after a night of playing cards, leaving Endre offended and confused. The incident affects Mária, and she begins to open herself up to new experiences and sensations, such as listening to romantic music, watching pornography, and observing couples at the park.

However, Endre has grown pessimistic about their budding relationship and calls it off. He sleeps with another woman, though the encounter leaves him disappointed. A devastated Mária prepares to commit suicide at home, calmly slitting her wrist in the bathtub. The suicide is interrupted by Endre calling her, and after a short and awkward conversation, he reveals that he loves her, which Mária reciprocates. After getting her wound bandaged, she goes to Endre's home, where they make love. After falling asleep, they wake up to realize that neither of them dreamed the night before.

Cast
 Alexandra Borbély as Mária
 Géza Morcsányi as Endre
 Réka Tenki as Klára
 Zoltán Schneider as Jenő
 Ervin Nagy as Sanyi
 Itala Békés as Zsóka

Reception

On review aggregator Rotten Tomatoes, the film has an approval rating of 89%, based on 75 reviews, with an average rating of 7.34/10. The website's critical consensus reads, "Tender performances and a strong sense of style combine to create an eccentric, dreamy portrait of love and loneliness in On Body and Soul." On Metacritic, the film has a score of 77 out of 100, based on 10 critics, indicating "generally favorable reviews".

Accolades

See also
 List of submissions to the 90th Academy Awards for Best Foreign Language Film
 List of Hungarian submissions for the Academy Award for Best Foreign Language Film

References

External links

 
 

2017 drama films
2017 films
Films directed by Ildikó Enyedi
Golden Bear winners
Hungarian drama films
2020s Hungarian-language films
Films about dreams